The Lilian Ida Smith Award also known as the NZSA Lilian Ida Smith Award is a New Zealand literary award from the New Zealand Society of Authors. The award is named after Lilian Ida Smith, a music teacher from Whanganui. She granted the New Zealand Society of Authors funds to ‘assist people aged 35 yrs and over to embark upon or further a literary career’.

From 1986–1990 the award consisted of three categories, poetry, fiction and non-fiction, with each recipient awarded $1000. From 1992 the award became biennial award with a prize fund of $3000 for a project in any genre, while after 2017 it was awarded every three years.

Between 1986 and 1990 recipients of the award were:

From 1992 the recipients of the award are:

References

External links 
 Official website

New Zealand poetry awards
New Zealand fiction awards